Prabhasa venosa is a moth of the family Erebidae. It is found in eastern India (West Bengal, Sikkim, Assam), Myanmar, Thailand, China (Zhejiang, Fujian, Jiangxi, Hunan, Hubei, Sichuan, Guangdong) and Taiwan.

References

Moths described in 1878
Lithosiina